The Great Mosque of Touba is a mosque in Touba, Senegal. It was founded by Ahmad Bamba in 1887 and completed in 1963. Bamba died in 1927 and was interred inside the mosque. Since his death the mosque has been controlled by his family. It is the largest building in the city and one of the largest mosques in Africa, with a capacity of 7,000. It is the site of a pilgrimage, the Grand Magal of Touba.

It is the home of the Mouride Brotherhood, a Sufi order, thus making it important to that order.

History
The construction of the great mosque at Touba was conceived in the final years of Ahmad Bamba's life, around 1924–27. He also chose it as the location for his tomb. Senegal's colonial rulers of the time, the French, agreed the scheme in 1926, albeit after some hesitation. Construction was delayed because of the misappropriation of the first round of funds and then, under the direction of Mamadu Mustafâ Mbacke, Bamba's son and successor, proceeded only very slowly. In 1932 the foundations were completed; work paused in 1939–1947; and the building was inaugurated in 1963. Mamadu Mustafâ was also entombed there.

Design 

The mosque is 100 metres long and 80 metres wide. It has seven minarets, three large domes and eleven other domes, and two ablution chambers. The central minaret is 96 metres (315 feet) tall.

The immediate vicinity of the mosque houses the mausoleum of Ahmad Bamba's sons, the caliphs of the Mouride order. Other institutions in the center of the holy city include a library boasting 160,000 volumes, the Caliph's official audience hall, a sacred "Well of Mercy", and a cemetery.

The Great Minaret of the Great Mosque of Touba is also commonly referred to as Lamp Fall, which was named by the second Mouride caliph in honour of Ibrahima Fall (the founder of the Baye Fall community).

Gallery

See also
 Lists of mosques
 List of mosques in Africa
 List of mosques in Egypt

References

External links

1963 establishments in Senegal
Mosques in Senegal
Touba, Senegal
Sufism in Senegal
Sufi mosques
Mosques completed in 1963